Ahmetpaşa may refer to the following places in Turkey:

 Ahmetpaşa, Bartın, a village in the district of Bartın, Bartın Province
 Ahmetpaşa, Sinanpaşa, a village in the district of Sinanpaşa, Afyonkarahisar Province